is a Japanese voice actress. She is affiliated with Holy Peak.

Biography

Filmography

Anime
Aikatsu! – Arisa Umeda
Aikatsu Friends! – Suzuka Ise
Baku Tech! Bakugan – Tatsuma
Beyond the Boundary – Ai Shindō
Fairy Tail – Village Girl
Fantasista Doll – Miko Uno
Girls und Panzer – Yūki Utsugi
Gunma-chan – Yayoi-hime
Heybot! – Sky Rabbit
Love, Chunibyo & Other Delusions! – Cento
Nora, Princess, and Stray Cat – Nobuchina Takada
Nura: Rise of the Yokai Clan – Errand Rat Yōkai
Shirobako – Erika Yano, Hiroko Tokiwa, Tatiana Yakovlef
Sound! Euphonium – Yūko Yoshikawa
Tamako Market – Choi Mochimazzui
Umineko When They Cry – Beelzebub
Yumeiro Patissiere – Chocolat, Sayuri Kanda
Yashahime: Princess Half-Demon – Aiya

Original video animation
Shirobako – Tatiana Yakovlef

Anime films
 Girls und Panzer das Finale: Part 1 – Yūki Utsugi
 Girls und Panzer das Finale: Part 2 – Yūki Utsugi
 Girls und Panzer das Finale: Part 3 – Yūki Utsugi
 Girls und Panzer der Film – Yūki Utsugi
Love, Chunibyo & Other Delusions! Take on Me – Cento
Shirobako: The Movie – Erika Yano

Video games
Alice Gear Aegis – Kanade Nikitō
Another Eden – Renri
Arcana Heart 3: LOVE MAX SIX STARS!!!!! – Minori Amanohara
Arknights – Conviction
Azur Lane – Admiral Hipper, Foxhound, Achilles
Exos Heroes – Magi
Tokyo 7th Sisters – Manon Hoshigaki
Umineko no Naku Koro ni: Majo to Suiri no Rondo – Beelzebub
Umineko no Naku Koro ni: Shinjitsu to Gensō no Yasōkyoku – Beelzebub
Xenoblade Chronicles 2 – Obrona (Kamui)

References

External links
Official blog 
Agency profile 

Living people
Japanese video game actresses
Japanese voice actresses
Voice actresses from Saitama Prefecture
Year of birth missing (living people)